The Arthur W. and Chloe B. Cole House (also known as The Octagon House and Cole's Castle) is an historic octagonal house located at 5803 Rocky Branch Road near Houston, Texas County, Missouri. Construction began in 1898 and was completed in 1901. Its walls are of poured concrete.

It was listed on the National Register of Historic Places on December 10, 1998.

References

Octagon houses in the United States
Houses on the National Register of Historic Places in Missouri
Houses completed in 1901
Houses in Texas County, Missouri
National Register of Historic Places in Texas County, Missouri